Eden is a village in Yazoo County, Mississippi. Per the 2020 Census, the population was 133.

Geography

History
In 1888, Frank Guise, an African-American man was shot and killed for allegedly insulting a white person.

Demographics

2020 census

Note: the US Census treats Hispanic/Latino as an ethnic category. This table excludes Latinos from the racial categories and assigns them to a separate category. Hispanics/Latinos can be of any race.

2000 Census
As of the census of 2000, there were 126 people, 47 households, and 33 families residing in the village. The population density was 260.3 people per square mile (101.4/km2). There were 59 housing units at an average density of 121.9 per square mile (47.5/km2). The racial makeup of the village was 57.94% White and 42.06% African American.

There were 47 households, out of which 40.4% had children under the age of 18 living with them, 40.4% were married couples living together, 23.4% had a female householder with no husband present, and 27.7% were non-families. 27.7% of all households were made up of individuals, and 8.5% had someone living alone who was 65 years of age or older. The average household size was 2.68 and the average family size was 3.26.

In the village, the population was spread out, with 29.4% under the age of 18, 9.5% from 18 to 24, 27.8% from 25 to 44, 19.0% from 45 to 64, and 14.3% who were 65 years of age or older. The median age was 33 years. For every 100 females, there were 96.9 males. For every 100 females age 18 and over, there were 85.4 males.

The median income for a household in the village was $24,286, and the median income for a family was $24,375. Males had a median income of $40,625 versus $11,750 for females. The per capita income for the village was $16,675. There were 30.6% of families and 35.7% of the population living below the poverty line, including 44.4% of under eighteens and 11.1% of those over 64.

Education
The Village of Eden is served by the Yazoo County School District. Residents are zoned to Yazoo County Middle School and Yazoo County High School.

Public Safety
The village and surrounding areas near the Village are covered under the Eden Volunteer Fire Department. The department is composed of a Fire Chief and approximately 15 volunteer firefighters. The department's apparatus equipment is composed of an Engine truck, a brush truck and a tanker truck. The village also receives mutual aid from District 3 Volunteer Fire Department, just outside Yazoo City. The Volunteer Fire Department also provides emergency medical care as a first responder unit along with Pafford Ambulance, a contracted EMS provider for the County. 

Law Enforcement is provided by the Yazoo County Sheriffs Office.

In popular culture
 The fictional character of Melodie St. Ann Celestine, played by actress Evan Rachel Wood in the Woody Allen fictional film Whatever Works, is from Eden, Mississippi.

Notable person
 James "Son" Thomas, blues musician, gravedigger and sculptor.

References

Villages in Mississippi
Villages in Yazoo County, Mississippi